A Terrible Beauty may refer to:

A Terrible Beauty (film) a 1960 American drama film
A Terrible Beauty (album) by the Uncle Devil Show, 2004
Terrible Beauty (novel), by Peter T. King, 1999

See also
Kobna ubavina (Terrible Beauty Is Born), a 2004 album by Mizar